Luisa Gonzaga de León (June 21, 1805-1843) was a Filipina author and translator. She is best known for writing and publishing the Ejercicio Cotidiano, a book of Catholic prayers translated from Spanish and Tagalog sources into the Kapampangan language, the native tongue of the people of the Pampanga province of central Luzon. These pioneering efforts to bring Catholic prayers and mass closer to the people by presenting them in their native language preceded the Second Vatican Council's move in this direction by over 100 years. 

With the 1844 posthumous publication of Ejercicio Cotidiano, de León became the first published native Filipina author as well as the first Kapangpangan to publish. She was also the first to translate the missal into a vernacular language of the Philippines.

Early life and education 
Luisa Gonzaga de León was born in the Cabangbangan barrio of Bacolor, Pampanga on June 21, 1805, the feast day of San Luis Gonzaga. Her parents were Jose Leonardo de León and Casimira Custodia. Both were originally from Manila and members of prominent families. Her paternal grandfather, Francisco Tico, was a Chinese entrepreneur while her maternal relatives and her paternal grandmother were native Filipinos. 

The governor-general appointed her father to be notary for the Pampanga province. After King Carlos IV approved his nomination to this station on July 5, 1803, the couple moved to Bacolor.

Her parents had one son, Jose Aniceto, before she was born. It is supposed that de León studied at a religious school in Manila where she learned Spanish along with reading, writing, mathematics, and religion. de León's uncle and godfather, Dr. Pedro León de Arzega, was "the first Filipino layman to graduate with a doctorate in any field."

Personal life 
de León married Don Francisco Paula de los Santos, another Chinese mestizo, around 1820. She was around 15 years old. Only a year after their marriage, her husband assumed a leadership position in Bacolor while also serving as the governor of Pampanga province. The couple had three sons. Celestino Mariano, born July 18, 1822, became a governor of his father's home town of Porac. Jose Maria, born March 19, 1825, became governor of Bacolor. Their youngest son, Francisco, died in childhood. Between the time of Celestino's birth and Jose's birth, the couple moved from Bacolor to Porac. 

Her husband, Francisco, died around 1840, and Luisa became sick soon after. As referenced in the preface of Ejercicio Cotidiano, she wrote the book during a period of confinement. Being afflicted with tuberculosis, she was prohibited from attending mass during the last days of her life.

Despite claiming to be an "india", a woman of Filipino descent, de León was a mestizo de sangley, possessing mixed Chinese and Filipino ancestry. Her paternal grandfather was Chinese. de León's identification with her maternal Filipino ancestors signaled where her alliances lay. They may have also helped her avoid the stigma and high taxes Chinese mestizos faced under Spanish colonial rule.

Like the first Filipina publisher, Remigia Salazar, de León pursued publishing her writing only once she had become a widow.

Ejercicio Cotidiano 

Based on the bibliographic record, historians believe Gonzaga de León's Ejercicio Cotidiano (Daily Devotion) to be the first book published by a native Filipino woman. The book translates, from Spanish and Tagalog to Kapampangan, Catholic prayers and the liturgy of the Catholic mass. While the 308 page book had a Spanish title, its subtitle was Kapampangan. It's translation: "Translated from the Spanish language to the Kapampangan language by Doña Luisa Gonzaga de Leon, India of the town of Bacolor." 

Though the Spanish Civil Code governing the Philippines during her lifetime allowed women to publish only through her husband's permission, Gonzaga de Leon's status as a widow allowed her to bypass this obstacle. Her 1843 death, however, preceded the publication of her book. Her sons published, through the University of Santo Tomas, Ejercicio Cotidiano in the year or two after her death.

Spanish priests had not translated the texts associated with the Catholic mass into any of the native Filipino languages. The publication of de León's translations marked the first time the Catholic texts and prayers became accessible to a native Filipino people in the vernacular (in this case, Kapangpangan).

Editions 
No known copies of the book's first printing exist. The National Library of the Philippines possesses a copy of the 1854 second edition, which was printed by the University of Santo Tomás Press. The National Library had acquired this copy from the Compañía General de Tabacos (General Tobacco Company of the Philippines). It was one of a handful of the National Library's collection which survived World War II. 

The only other known copy of this second edition is held in Library of the Colegio de Padres Agustinos in Valladolid, Spain. Further editions include the 1867, 1910, and 1967 reprintings. Gonzaga de Leon's descendent Don Mariano A. Henson published the last edition as the Catholic church began implementing the Second Vatican Council decision to deliver the mass in the language spoken by worshippers.

Sections 
The Ejercicio Cotidiano included sections on Prayers for Confession and Communion, Way of the Cross, Holy Rosary. It also included a section called Trisagium which contained sets of three-day prayers in praise of the Holy Trinity.

Preface 
Due to its being mostly a translation, the preface represents the most original part wherein Gonzaga de Leon's personal voice shines through. This preface, the first printed essay by a Filipina writer, was "a spiritual essay rising, in the end, to poetry of mystic inspiration" similar to the ecstatic articulations of Teresa of Ávila.

The preface opens with a reference to the author's "sad and frail condition" and acknowledgment of certain limitations, including a lack of mastery in the Spanish or Tagalog languages from which she translates. She possessed more proficiency in Spanish than Tagalog.

Illustrations 
24 illustrations by an engraver named Noguera are interspersed throughout the text. These images portray different aspects of the Catholic mass and significant events from Jesus's life. Noguera may have been an indio, a Filipino native. Notably, the illustrations also depict a native Filipino priest delivering mass, rather than a Spaniard.

References 

1805 births
1843 deaths
Filipino women writers
19th-century Filipino writers
19th-century women writers
Writers from Pampanga